Iki arvadli is a comic dance that was created in Karadagli village in the Shaki district. It is performed by men.

Notes

Azerbaijani dances